Narty  is a village in the administrative district of Gmina Jedwabno, within Szczytno County, Warmian-Masurian Voivodeship, in northern Poland.

The area used to be a part of East Prussia, which was a fiefdom of Poland.
The village was established by Stanislaw Witkowski in 1571

References

Narty